The "E" Ticket was a fanzine devoted to the history of Disneyland and its attractions, especially the park as it existed during the lifetime of Walt Disney, publishing forty six issues between 1986 and 2009. It was edited and published by Disneyland fans Leon Janzen and Jack Janzen until Leon's sudden death on September 9, 2003. The last issue published by the brothers was the Fall 2003 Issue, #40, on Adventure Thru Inner Space. Jack continued the magazine without his brother, beginning with #41 in October 2004. In the final issue, #46 (Summer 2009), Jack noted that making the magazine "Hasn't been much fun without Leon", and he decided to end the magazine's run.

Disney and animation historian Michael Barrier has cited it as "An extremely valuable record, one that can no longer be duplicated, given the deaths of most of the interview subjects."

The magazine (including all remaining back stock) was sold in 2009 to the Walt Disney Family Foundation to augment the historic resources of The Walt Disney Family Museum it established that year. Back issues of "E" Ticket are sold at the Museum's bookstore.

The magazine was named after the E tickets that, before the move to flat-rate entry tickets, denoted the top rides in the park.

Issues
The following is a list of the issues of the magazine and the attraction, land, or other cover story featured:
1, Winter 1986 — 1955 Disneyland collectibles
2, Spring 1987 — Viewliner Train of Tomorrow and Knott's Berry Farm
3, Summer 1987 — Frontierland and Pacific Ocean Park
4, Winter 1987-88 — Snow White's Scary Adventures
5, Summer 1988 — 20,000 Leagues Under the Sea
6, Winter 1988-89 — Adventureland
7, Summer 1989 — Designing Disneyland with Marc Davis
8, Winter 1989-90 — Tomorrowland's Flying Saucers
9, Summer 1990 — Disneyland: 1959
10, Winter 1990-91 — Riding the Carolwood Pacific Rail Road with Walt Disney
11, Summer 1991 — Story Book Land
12, Winter 1991-92 — Monsanto's Home of the Future
13, Summer 1992 — Disneyland's Original Snow White Dark Ride
14, Winter 1992-93 — Disneyland's Main Street U.S.A.
15, Spring 1993 — Disneyland's Mark Twain
16, Summer 1993 — The Haunted Mansion
17, Winter 1993-94 — Tomorrowland 1967
18, Spring 1994 — On Disneyland's Waterways
19, Summer 1994 — Santa Fe and Disneyland Railroad
20, Winter 1994-95 — Mr. Toad's Wild Ride
21, Spring 1995 — Pirates of the Caribbean
22, Winter 1995 — Walt Disney's Carousel of Progress
23, Spring 1996 — Disney's Jungle Adventures
24, Summer 1996 — Disney's Rocket to the Moon
25, Winter 1996 — Mechanized Magic
26, Spring 1997 — Disney's Peter Pan Dark Ride
27, Summer 1997 — Autopia
28, Winter 1997 — Disneyland: The First 12 Months
29, Spring 1998 — The Disneyland Mine Train
30, Fall 1998 — Disney's Space Mountain
31, Spring 1999 — Alice in Wonderland
32, Fall 1999 — Pirates of the Caribbean
Special — Mr. Toad's Wild Ride (updated version of #20 released at "Mr. Toad's Enchanted Evening" event at Disneyland on October 28, 1999)
33, Spring 2000 — Disneyland's Keel Boats
34, Fall 2000 — Disneyland's Submarine Voyage
35, Spring 2001 — Disneyland's King Arthur Carrousel
36, Fall 2001 — Disneyland's Monorail
37, Spring 2002 — Tom Sawyer Island
38, Fall 2002 — "It's A Small World"
39, Spring 2003 — The Adventureland Story
40, Fall 2003 — Adventure Thru Inner Space
41, Fall 2004 — Disneyland's Ghost House
42, Spring 2005 — Disneyland's Matterhorn Bobsleds
43, Fall 2005 — Frontierland's Pack Mules
44, Summer 2006 — Walt's Model Shop
45, Summer 2007 — The Art of the Pirates of the Caribbean
46, Summer 2009 — Disneyland's Indiana Jones Adventure

Also produced were three CD-ROM collections of back issues in digital format:
CD 1: Contains issues 1–8, along with the 1988 Annual and 1991 Annual issues.
CD 2: Contains issues 9–16.
CD 3: Contains issues 17–24.

References

External links
 

Fanzines
Defunct magazines published in the United States
Disneyland
Magazines established in 1986
Magazines disestablished in 2009